Valhalla Golf Club, located in Louisville, Kentucky, is a private golf club designed by Jack Nicklaus, opened in 1986.

In 1992, Valhalla was selected to host the PGA Championship in the year 1996, one of golf's four majors. The following year (1993), the PGA of America purchased a 25% interest in the club. After the championship in 1996, the PGA of America raised its stake to 50% and announced that the event would return to Valhalla in 2000. At its conclusion, the PGA of America exercised an option to purchase the remaining interest in the club. Later that year, it announced that the Ryder Cup would be held at Valhalla in 2008.

Valhalla also hosted the PGA Club Professional Championship in 2002 and the Senior PGA Championship in 2004. The PGA Championship was originally scheduled to be played at Valhalla in 2004, but the PGA of America switched it to Whistling Straits in Wisconsin.

In 2009, the PGA of America announced that the Senior PGA Championship and the PGA Championship would return to Valhalla in 2011 and 2014, respectively. in November 2017, the PGA of America announced that the PGA Championship would return to Valhalla in 2024.

On June 1, 2022, the club and the PGA of America jointly announced that the club had been sold to a group of club members led by Jimmy Kirchdorfer, CEO of locally based piping supplier ISCO Industries. Other group members include former Yum! Brands CEO David Novak, businessman and former NBA player Junior Bridgeman, and hotelier Chester Musselman.

The course sits on a  property on Shelbyville Road (US 60) in the eastern portion of Louisville just outside the Gene Snyder Freeway (I-265) It was envisioned by local business leader Dwight Gahm (pronounced "game") and his three sons in 1981, and opened five years later.  Steve Houg is the head professional as of March 2016.

Major tournaments hosted
The 1996 PGA Championship was won in a playoff; Mark Brooks won his only major title with a birdie on the first extra hole, the par-5 18th. Franklin native Kenny Perry was the runner-up in the event's final sudden-death playoff. Four years later, the 2000 PGA Championship also went to a playoff; Tiger Woods won by one stroke over Bob May in the revised three-hole format. Woods had a 3-4-5=12 to May's 4-4-5=13 on the course's final three holes. It was Woods' second consecutive PGA Championship, his fifth major title and his third of his eventual "Tiger Slam" of four consecutive major titles – the PGA Championship was preceded by the 2000 U.S. Open at Pebble Beach and the 2000 Open Championship at the Old Course at St Andrews and then followed by the 2001 Masters at Augusta National.) Valhalla hosted its third PGA Championship in 2014, when Rory McIlroy beat Phil Mickelson also by one stroke. Beforehand, the course had undergone a major "modernization" after it hosted the Senior PGA Championship in 2011, which included the rebuilding of all 18 greens.

In addition, Valhalla hosted the Ryder Cup in 2008, with the United States defeating Europe 16½ to 11½ for the first U.S. win since their comeback victory in 1999 at The Country Club in Brookline, Massachusetts. Perry and another native Kentuckian – J. B. Holmes of Campbellsville, who made the team as one of American captain Paul Azinger's four picks - were part of the victorious Team USA and accounted for a combined five points.

The Club will host the 2024 PGA Championship, marking the fourth time as host site for that major.

Scorecard
Course setup for the 2014 PGA Championship

See also
 Sports in Louisville, Kentucky
 List of attractions and events in the Louisville metropolitan area

References

External links
 

 Nicklaus.com   Valhalla Golf Club
 2008 Ryder Cup: course description
 Louisville Courier-Journal: course map for 2008 Ryder Cup

Golf clubs and courses in Kentucky
Golf clubs and courses designed by Jack Nicklaus
Ryder Cup venues
Sports venues in Louisville, Kentucky
1986 establishments in Kentucky
Sports venues completed in 1986